Una Vez Más is the fourth album by Venezuelan group Calle Ciega, released in 2005. The album was re-released in 2006 with two bonus tracks.

Track listing
 "Mi Cachorrita" – 3:39
 "Como Te Extraña Mi Cama" – 3:28
 "Sígueme" – 3:23
 "Los Latinos (estamos de la moda)" – 3:39
 "Una Vez Más" – 3:48
 "Cazadora" – 3:40
 "Porque Te Amo" – 4:44
 "Ya No Tienes Perdón" – 3:36
 "Dejame Entrar a Tu Corazón" – 4:23
 "Yo Me Enamore" – 3:40
 "Me Tienes Volando" – 3:38
 "El Vestido Rojo" – 3:45
 "La Carcajada" – 3:33
 "Quiero" – 3:45
 "La Avispa" – 3:48

2006 bonus tracks
<li> "Between You and I" – 3:57
<li> "Una Fan Enamorada" – 4:10

2005 albums
Calle Ciega albums